Michael McGinty is an American retired soccer player who is currently an assistant coach with North Carolina FC in the USL Championship. During his career, McGinty played as a goalkeeper for various Major League Soccer teams.

Playing career 
During his playing career, McGinty played college soccer for Wake Forest University, and was a backup goalie for various A-League and MLS teams.

Coaching career

Virginia Cavaliers 
From 1999 until 2009, McGinty served on George Gelnovatch's coaching staff at the University of Virginia.

Saint Louis Billikens 
On March 10, 2010, McGinty was hired as the head coach for the Saint Louis Billikens men's soccer team. McGinty was formally introduced on March 23, 2010.

On November 10, 2017, it was announced that McGinty's contract with Saint Louis University was not renewed. McGinty finished his coaching career for the Billikens with an 81–56–14 record.

North Carolina FC 
After serving as a coach with various United States youth national teams, McGinty joined Dave Sarachan's staff at North Carolina FC of the USL Championship.

Honors

Coach 
 Atlantic 10 Conference Coach of the Year (3): 2012, 2013, 2016

References

External links 
 
 SLU Coaching Profile
 UVA Coaching Profile

1971 births
Living people
A-League (1995–2004) players
American soccer coaches
American soccer players
Association football goalkeepers
Chicago Fire FC players
Columbus Crew players
D.C. United players
Major League Soccer players
North Carolina FC coaches
North Carolina Fusion U23 players
Richmond Kickers players
Saint Louis Billikens men's soccer coaches
Soccer players from Sacramento, California
USL Championship coaches
Virginia Cavaliers men's soccer coaches
Wake Forest Demon Deacons men's soccer players